Keith Hay Park, is a reserve and sports ground in the suburb of Mount Roskill in Auckland, New Zealand. It is the home ground of New Zealand National League and Northern League side Auckland United and the Tri Star Gymnastics Club.

Cameron Pools and Leisure Centre is also located at Keith Hay Park. The ground also hosts cricket games during the summer and is used as one of Eden Roskill Cricket Club's grounds.

History
Developed on old swampy land, in 1879 Keith Hay Park was described as "cleared, beautifully undulating country dotted with picturesque homesteads and sheening in emerald green with the verdure of luxuriant crops".

Keith Hay Park was named after Keith Hay, a former mayor of the Mt Roskill Borough Council. The ground also has a playground, public toilets and a basketball half court. Keith Hay developed the surrounding land 

In 2014, 7000 square meters of carparking, landscaping and footpath installation was completed to provide for the growth of users.

In September 2022, it was announced by FIFA that Keith Hay Park was shortlisted to be a team base camp for the 2023 FIFA Women's World Cup. On 12 December 2022, it was announced that New Zealand would use Keith Hay Park as their training ground during the world cup.

References

Association football venues in New Zealand
Sports venues in Auckland
Association football in Auckland